The Silver Lamp was an award given annually from 1954 to 1973 by the Association of Icelandic Drama Critics (Félag íslenskra leikdómenda), a professional group of writers for the Reykjavík newspapers, for the best performance of the year on the Icelandic stage.

History
Tha award was instituted by the association of drama critics of the Reykjavík newspapers, who numbered half a dozen at the time, upon its foundation in March 1954. The lamp was designed by Leifur Kaldal, a goldsmith, to recall the oil lamps historically used in Icelandic homes. The award was the first acting award and possibly the first cultural award in Iceland.

The recipient was chosen by a vote based on total points for the year's performances, which led to some admired actors never achieving it. The first woman to win the award was Guðbjörg Þorbjarnardóttir, in 1961.

The chairman of the association, Þorvarður Helgason, the drama critic for Morgunblaðið, announced in response that the award would no longer be given. The 1973 lamp was subsequently sold at auction.

Award recipients
 1954 - Haraldur Björnsson 
 1955 - Valur Gíslason
 1956 - 
 1957 - 
 1958 - Valur Gíslason
 1959 - Brynjólfur Jóhanesson
 1960 - no award
 1961 - Guðbjörg Þorbjarnardóttir
 1962 - 
 1963 - Gunnar Eyjólfsson
 1964 - Helgi Skúlason
 1965 - Gísli Halldórsson
 1966 - Þorsteinn Ö. Stephensen
 1967 - 
 1968 - Helga Bachmann
 1969 - Róbert Arnfinnsson
 1970 - 
 1971 - Sigríður Hagalín
 1972 - 
 1973 -  (declined)

References

Theatre acting awards
1954 establishments in Iceland